Monochaetum is a neotropical genus of shrubs and subshrubs with about 54 species. It occurs in warm temperate to tropical montane habitats from Mexico and Central America to the South American Andes of Colombia, Venezuela, Ecuador and Peru with one species reaching the Guayana Highlands of Venezuela and Guyana. 

Monochaetum is characterized by its tetramerous flowers, prevailingly dimorphic stamens with dorsally appendiculate anthers, capsular fruits that are free from the hypanthium, and cochleate seeds.

Selected species 
 Monochaetum alpestre Naudin
 Monochaetum amabile Almeda
 Monochaetum amistadense Almeda
 Monochaetum bonplandii (Humb. & Bonpl.) Naudin
 Monochaetum brachyurum Naudin
 Monochaetum calcarutum (DC.) Triana
 Monochaetum candollei Cogn.
 Monochaetum compactum Almeda
 Monochaetum cordatum Almeda
 Monochaetum coronatum Gleason
 Monochaetum deppeanum (Schltdl. & Cham.) Naudin
 Monochaetum dicranantherum Naudin
 Monochaetum discolor H. Karst. ex Triana
 Monochaetum exaltatum Almeda
 Monochaetum floribundum (Schltdl.) Naudin
 Monochaetum glanduliferum Triana
 Monochaetum gleasonianum Wurdack
 Monochaetum hartwegianum Naudin
 Monochaetum hirtum (H. Karst.) Triana ex Cogn.
 Monochaetum humboldtianum Kunth ex Walp.
 Monochaetum jahnii Pittier
 Monochaetum latifolium Naudin
 Monochaetum linearifolium Almeda
 Monochaetum lineatum (D. Don) Naudin
 Monochaetum macrantherum Gleason
 Monochaetum mariae Wurdack
 Monochaetum meridense Naudin
 Monochaetum multiflorum (Bonpl.) Naudin
 Monochaetum myrtoideum Naudin
 Monochaetum neglectum Almeda
 Monochaetum pauciflorum Triana
 Monochaetum polyneuron Triana
 Monochaetum pulchrum Decne.
 Monochaetum rodriguezii Wurdack
 Monochaetum rubescens Gleason
 Monochaetum stellulatum Naudin
 Monochaetum subditivum J.F. Macbr.
 Monochaetum subglabrum Gleason
 Monochaetum tachirense Wurdack
 Monochaetum talamancense Almeda
 Monochaetum tenellum Naudin
 Monochaetum trichophyllum Almeda
 Monochaetum uberrimum 
 Monochaetum vestitum Almeda, Al. Rodr. & Garita
 Monochaetum villosum Gleason
 Monochaetum vulcanicum Cogn.

References

External links 
Melastomataceae of the World

Melastomataceae genera
Melastomataceae